Tsuneyuki "Tommy" Nakajima (born 20 October 1954) is a Japanese professional golfer.

Nakajima was born in Gunma. He turned professional in 1975. He has won 48 events on the Japan Golf Tour, ranking third on the most Japan Golf Tour wins list. He also was the leading money winner four times in five years: 1982, 1983, 1985 and 1986. He is second on the career money list (through 2009).

Nakajima featured in the top 5 of the Official World Golf Rankings and was ranked in the top-10 for 85 weeks from their debut in 1986 to 1987. He ranked as high as fifth on its predecessor McCormack's World Golf Rankings.

At the 1978 Masters Tournament, Nakajima made a 13 on the par-5 13th hole. After hitting his fourth shot into Rae's Creek, Nakajima elected to play the ball rather than take a drop. He popped the ball straight up and it landed on his foot, causing a two-stroke penalty. When he handed the club to his caddie, it slipped out of his hand and fell into the creek, incurring another two-stroke penalty. He chipped over the green, chipped back on and two-putted for the highest single-hole score in the history of the tournament.

Also in 1978, Nakajima was in contention at The Open Championship on the third day at St Andrews until he putted into – and then took four attempts to escape from – the Road Hole bunker at the 17th for a quintuple bogey, which led the British tabloids to christen that bunker, for a while, "the Sands of Nakajima". Nakajima's best finish in a major was third at the 1988 PGA Championship.

He would also feature in an epic match at the 1982 Suntory World Match Play Championship at Wentworth when he lost to Sandy Lyle only after an extended playoff.

Amateur wins
this list may be incomplete
1973 Japan Amateur Championship

Professional wins (58)

Japan Golf Tour wins (48)

*Note: The 1986 Mizuno Open was shortened to 63 holes due to rain.
1Co-sanctioned by the Asia Golf Circuit

Japan Golf Tour playoff record (7–6)

Other wins (5)
1976 Mizuno Pro Rookies Tournament, Young Lions Tournament
1977 Young Lions Tournament, Nihon Kokudo Keikaku Summers
1986 Nissan Cup Individual Trophy

Japan Senior PGA Tour wins (5)
2005 Japan Senior Open
2006 Japan PGA Senior Championship, Japan Senior Open
2008 Japan Senior Open
2013 Starts Senior Golf Tournament

Results in major championships

CUT = missed the half-way cut
"T" indicates a tie for a place

Summary

Most consecutive cuts made – 4 (1986 Masters – 1986 PGA)
Longest streak of top-10s – 1 (six times)

Results in The Players Championship

CUT = missed the halfway cut
"T" indicates a tie for a place

Team appearances
World Cup (representing Japan): 1996
Nissan Cup/Kirin Cup (representing Japan): 1985, 1986 (winners), 1987, 1988
Dunhill Cup (representing Japan): 1986
Dynasty Cup (representing Japan): 2003

See also
List of golfers with most Japan Golf Tour wins

References

External links

Japanese male golfers
Japan Golf Tour golfers
Sportspeople from Gunma Prefecture
1954 births
Living people